Brendan Fowler (born 24 March 1978 in Berkeley, CA) is a Los Angeles-based musician and multi-disciplinary artist who works in photography, sculpture, and performance. He first became known for his music performances and records released under the name of BARR. He is a regular performer at The Smell, a DIY music venue. He formerly co-ran Doggpony Records and co-edited ANP (Artist Network Program) Quarterly - an Orange County-based arts and culture publication funded by RVCA. Fowler has performed with Tracy and the Plastics, The New England Roses–a band consisting of Fowler, Sarah Shapiro, and Le Tigre's JD Samson–and Car Clutch, among others. He is the founder of the label VR/DM8H493.

Fowler turned to work in the visual arts in 2008. His artworks have been exhibited at Rivington Arms, New York, NY; Half Gallery, New York, NY; LAXART, Los Angeles, CA; Hezi Cohen Gallery, Tel Aviv, Israel; The Museum of Modern Art, New York, NY; A Palazzo Gallery, Brescia, Italy; UNTITLED, New York, NY; Gemeente Museum Den Haag, the Netherlands; Shane Campbell Gallery, Chicago, IL. Upcoming exhibitions include Open Tunings at MIT List Visual Arts Center in November 2014.

Discography

 Split 7" (with Lil Pocketknife) (2004), Deathbomb Arc, Abstract Machine 
 What Would the Second BARR (2004), Doggpony Records, Tapes Records
 Split 7" (with This Song Is A Mess But So Am I) (2005), Oedipus Records
 Beyond Reinforced Jewel Case (2005), 5RC
 PPM9 7" (2006) PPM
 Summary (2007), 5RC

References

External links
 Brendan Fowler CV
 Official BARR site
 5RC (record label)
 Doggpony Records
 ANP Quarterly Magazine
 L.A. RECORD interview (March 2008)
 Artkrush.com feature on BARR (January 2006)
 Summary Review at Pitchfork Media

1978 births
Living people
Musicians from Berkeley, California
Singers from California
21st-century American singers